Ali Dinar (1856 – November 6, 1916) was a Sultan of the Sultanate of Darfur and ruler from the Keira dynasty.  
  
In 1898, with the decline of the Mahdists, he managed to regain Darfur's independence.

A rebellion led by him in 1915—in the context of his giving his support to the Ottoman Empire during the First World War— led the British government to dispatch the Anglo-Egyptian Darfur Expedition, in which he was killed in action, after which his Sultanate was incorporated into the Anglo-Egyptian Condominium.

Further reading 

 'Alī Dīnār, Last Sultan of Darfur, 1898–1916

References
 Entry in the Encyclopædia Britannica
 Jay Spaulding,Lidwien Kapteijns: An Islamic alliance: ʻAlī Dīnār and the Sānūsiyya, 1906-1916 at Google Books

1856 births
1916 deaths
Sultans of Darfur
Keira dynasty
History of Sudan
Darfur
Egypt in World War I
Ottoman Empire in World War I
Muslim monarchs
Monarchs killed in action